Desiderata is the fourth studio album by Norwegian metal band Madder Mortem, released on 24 April 2006 (in Norway on 27 March 2006). It was their first CD release on Peaceville Records. The album spawned a digital single, "My Name Is Silence". A video was also shot for the single.

Desiderata is the Latin word for "those things worthy of desire".

Track listing

Personnel 
Madder Mortem
Agnete M. Kirkevaag – lead vocals
BP M. Kirkevaag – guitars, backing vocals, percussion
Odd E. Ebbesen – guitars
Tormod L. Moseng – bass guitar, double bass, backing vocals
Mads Solås – drums, percussion, backing vocals

Production
Produced by Madder Mortem
Engineered by Henning Ramseth and Madder Mortem
Mixed by Fredrik Nordström and Patrick Sten at Studio Fredman, except "Dystopia" and "Cold Stone" (mixed by Henning Ramseth at Space Valley studio)
Mastering by Peter In de Betou at Tailor Maid

References

External links 
 Discography at the official Madder Mortem website

2006 albums
Madder Mortem albums
Peaceville Records albums